A. T. George is a member of 13th Kerala Legislative Assembly. He belongs to Indian National Congress party and represented Parassala constituency.

Political life
He started his political life as the president of Kerala Students Union, the students' wing of Indian National Congress. He served as the leader of opposition of Parassala Grama Panchayat and director of Parassala Service Co-operative bank. He is presently the president of several artisans' and laborers' unions functioning within the Indian National Congress.

Personal life
He is the son of Thankappan Nadar and Thressya. He was born in Parassala on 12 March 1954. He is married to Prasanna Kumary G and has two children.

References

Members of the Kerala Legislative Assembly
Indian National Congress politicians from Kerala
1954 births
Living people
Place of birth missing (living people)